The Poetry of Ådalen (Swedish: Ådalens poesi) is a 1928 Swedish silent drama film directed by Theodor Berthels and starring Mathias Taube, Hilda Borgström and Jessie Wessel. It was later remade into a 1947 film of the same title.

Cast
 Mathias Taube as 	Ortorpsfar
 Hilda Borgström as 	Markus hustru	
 Jessie Wessel as 	Sago-Gunnel
 Einar Axelsson as 	Greger Anner
 Eric Laurent as 	Ingvar
 Alf Sjöberg as 	Gunvard
 Solveig Hedengran as 	Ingjerd, Ingvars dotter som vuxen
 Allan Egnell as 	Sigge Alm, skald
 Joel Jansson as 	Dräng på Ortorpsgården
 Theodor Berthels as Präst
 Mats Sjödin as Ingjerd som treåring

References

Bibliography
 Gustafsson, Tommy . Masculinity in the Golden Age of Swedish Cinema: A Cultural Analysis of 1920s Films. McFarland, 2014.

External links

1928 films
1928 drama films
Swedish drama films
Swedish silent feature films
Swedish black-and-white films
Films directed by Theodor Berthels
Silent drama films
1920s Swedish films